Pseudohamelia is a genus of flowering plants belonging to the family Rubiaceae.

Its native range is Colombia.

Species:
 Pseudohamelia hirsuta Wernham

References

Rubiaceae
Rubiaceae genera